A red dot magnifier is an optical telescope that can be paired with a non-magnifying optical sight on a weapon to create a telescopic sight. 
They work with the parallel collimated reticle image produced by certain non-magnifying sights so, contrary to the name, they can be used with sights other than red dot sights, like holographic weapon sights.

Description
Red dot magnifiers, sometimes also called flip to side magnifiers, are optical telescopes that provide increased magnification to a shooter's view when they are engaged. They are commonly mounted behind a red dot, holographic, or other non-magnified sights that produce a collimated reticle image. Most have mounts which allow them to flip to the side when not in use, though immobile mounts exist as well. This allows greater versatility for the shooter as the shooter will have the benefits of a clear non-magnified red dot sight (and not worry about parallax or eye relief) when engaging near targets yet still be able to convert that sight to a telescopic sight with increase magnification to spot and shoot at more distant targets.

Magnifiers typically are 3× telescopes but can range from 2–6× or more. They are used by police and Special Operations Forces who may use the non-magnified optic for Close-quarters combat and utilize the magnifier to engage farther targets. Hunters may also use them as the increased magnification can aid in target discrimination when prey are difficult to spot in brush or vegetation.

Magnifiers offer several advantages and disadvantages compared to other firearm sights. Use of the magnifier is very quick and is easier than rotating the housing of a traditional telescopic sight. However, there typically is no option to make fine increases or decreases in zoom, as one would be able to with a standard telescopic sight. Weight may become an issue as well. While the non-magnified optic and the magnifier may each be lighter than other optics, when combined with mounts a magnifier setup may be significantly heavier and/or unbalanced compared to traditional telescopic sights. When flipped to the side, the magnifier may also snag on obstacles. The same may apply to cost with the combined cost for optic, magnifier, and mounts may be greater than the cost for a variable power telescopic sight.

Use
A magnifier is mounted onto a firearm, usually on a Picatinny rail, in line with the primary non-magnified optic. When not in use, the magnifier may be flipped to the side (usually the right) so the shooter sees through their non-magnified optic alone; when flipped in line, it will magnify the view through the non-magnified optic. This will also have the effect of magnifying the sight so the red dot or holographic reticle will appear larger as well. When flipped in, the user will also have to account for parallax and eye relief. As a result, the non-magnified optic and the magnifier must be placed such that the shooter will have the correct amount of eye relief when looking through the magnifier.

Notes

References

External links

Firearm sights